Jenkins Run is a tributary of the Beaver River in western Pennsylvania.  The stream rises in western Lawrence County and flows east entering the Beaver River south of Moravia, Pennsylvania. The watershed is roughly 60% agricultural, 31% forested and the rest is other uses.

References

Rivers of Pennsylvania
Tributaries of the Beaver River
Rivers of Lawrence County, Pennsylvania